Eaglesvale Preparatory School is a Christian, co-educational independent, boarding and day school situated on an estate approximately 100 acres in Harare, Zimbabwe. It is 12 km south west of the Harare Central Business District. The school is located on the same estate with Eaglesvale Senior School which is the high school.

Eaglesvale Preparatory School is a member of the Association of Trust Schools (ATS) and the Headmaster is members of the Conference of Heads of Independent Schools in Zimbabwe (CHISZ).

See also 

 Eaglesvale Senior School
 List of schools in Zimbabwe

Notes

References

External links 
 
 Eaglesvale Preparatory School Profile on the ATS website

Schools in Harare
Private schools in Zimbabwe
Co-educational schools in Zimbabwe
Day schools in Zimbabwe
Educational institutions established in 1911
Member schools of the Association of Trust Schools
1911 establishments in the British Empire